Lime Kiln Field Day (also known as Lime Kiln Club Field Day or Bert Williams: Lime Kiln Field Day) is a 1913 American black-and-white silent film produced by the Biograph Company and Klaw and Erlanger.

Production background
Led by the famous Caribbean American musical theater performer and recording artist Bert Williams, the cast involved Harlem-based entertainment pioneers Sam Lucas, Abbie Mitchell, J. Leubrie Hill, Emma Reed, John Wesley (Wes) Jenkins (1859-1930), Walker Thompson (1887-1922), Billy Harper, and other theater performers, including members of J. Leubrie Hill’s Darktown Follies stage company.

Biograph Company produced the film for Marcus Klaw and A. L. Erlanger in the Bronx, New York. Lime Kiln Field Day was shot at locations in New York as well as New Jersey using a 35mm camera at 19fps.

After filming over an hour of footage, the producers Klaw and Erlanger abandoned the project during post-production, leaving the film to be without a title and locked away by the Biograph Film Studio.

Screenings of restored footage
In 2014, the film was deemed "culturally, historically, or aesthetically significant" by the Library of Congress and selected for preservation in the National Film Registry. Screenings of the restored footage took place in October 2014 at the Museum of Modern Art in New York, and on June 1, 2015, at the San Francisco Silent Film Festival. A screening of the film was scheduled for May 2018 at the Harry Ransom Center in Austin.

Preservation 
The only written reference to the footage was found in an obituary in the New York Age (August 1914) for Sam Corker Jr., a member of the films production crew. The obituary stated "Last fall he employed a large number of colored performers for the 'Lime Kiln Film Club' series of motion pictures produced by Klaw and Erlanger in which Bert A. Williams will be featured."

In 1939, Iris Barry, film curator of the Museum of Modern Art, saved the reels, which formed part of MOMA's early film collection. The negatives of the film were discovered in a cache of 900 film canisters donated from the Actinograph Corp. Bronx Biograph studio and laboratory facilities from the contents of its film vaults. The Museum of Modern Art eventually made the first print of the film in 1976. The museum would go on to name the film Bert Williams: Lime Kiln Field Day. The title of the film came from one of the sources for the film’s narrative, a stage routine based on a fictional black social club, the Lime Kiln Club.

No script, intertitles, or production credits for the film survived. By examining the footage frame by frame, and by hiring a lip reader to determine the dialogue, Museum of Modern Art curators reconstructed the planned film's narrative. As well as the footage, nearly 100 still images of the interracial production were recovered from within the unedited material, providing evidence of an historic effort. The photos show two white directors, Edwin Middleton and T. Hayes Hunter as well as white crewmembers.

Synopsis 
A summary of the film was written for the 9th annual "Orphan Film Symposium" at EYE Film Institute Netherlands:

"Man about town and resident schemer (Bert Williams) is on the lookout for the next opportunity to advance his interests.  As a member of the fraternal Lime Kiln Club headed by Brother Gardner, he becomes involved in a contest with rival suitors to win the hand of the local beauty (Odessa Warren Grey)."

"Backed by white speculators, the club organizes its annual field day for black townsfolk who assemble outside the club bar and parade to the fairground led by a marching band. The day’s activities include dining on fried chicken and ice cream, wrestling for loose shoes and a greased pig, a watermelon-eating contest,  a spirited cakewalk, a ride on a merry-go-round, and a 100-yard dash, which Bert wins against a pint-sized competitor."

"Eyeing a man with a jug of gin, Bert sees the drink being hidden in a well and retrieves it for a taste before accidentally knocking the jug into the well. Undaunted, he writes "Gin Spring" on the wooden well enclosure and calls fairgoers over to sample the tasty polluted waters. Suddenly finding himself an entrepreneur, he sells his "discovery" to his rivals for a handful of cash and goes off with the girl for a day of food and fun."

Performance 
The black characters in the film are shown in scenes of play and leisure, which is rare for motion pictures of this time. Many depictions of black characters of this time made them out to be violent and greedy. A notorious example of this is the closely released D.W. Griffith film The Birth of a Nation.

In the film, Black star actor Bert Williams dons blackface. Theatre conventions of the day required one performer in a black musical to wear blackface, while the rest of the cast could perform without makeup.

Museum of Modern Art curator Ron Magliozzi says, “It was a sop to the white audience”. This film follows the theatrical conventions of that time with Bert Williams wearing black face. In Lime Kiln Field Day, Bert Williams being the romantic lead kisses Odessa Warren Grey at the conclusion of the film. This kind of intimacy between a black man and a black woman was a very rare occurrence during this period and it was something that was rarely seen again during the time.

Film debut 
After being in post-production for over 100 years, the film Bert Williams: Lime Kiln Field Day debuted excerpts and stills on October 24, 2014 at the Museum of Modern Art, in the Roy and Niuta Titus Theatre lobby galleries. The full 60 minutes of restored footage was premiered on November 8, 2014, in the Museum of Modern Art's annual "To Save and Project" festival dedicated to film preservation.

On June 1, 2015, the film was shown with live piano accompaniment by Donald Sosin at the San Francisco Silent Film Festival.

National Film Registry
In 2014, the film was deemed "culturally, historically, or aesthetically significant" by the Library of Congress and selected for preservation in the National Film Registry. In their press release, the Library cited that by "providing insight into early silent-film production... these outtakes or rushes show white and black cast and crew working together, enjoying themselves in unguarded moments. Even in fragments of footage, Williams proves himself among the most gifted of screen comedians."

See also
List of rediscovered films
African American cinema

References

External links

Pam Grady, "Silent Bit of Black History", San Francisco Chronicle (May 21, 2015)

1913 films
American silent feature films
American black-and-white films
United States National Film Registry films
Films directed by Edwin Middleton
1910s American films